C&C may refer to:

 C&C Group (formerly Cantrell and Cochrane), a consumer goods group based in Ireland
 C&C Yachts, sailboat builder
 C+C Music Factory, an American dance-pop and hip hop group
 Cambridge & Coleridge Athletic Club, based in Cambridge, United Kingdom
 Castles & Crusades, a role-playing game
 Chris & Cosey, an industrial music project of Throbbing Gristle members
 City and Colour, acoustic project from musician Dallas Green
 Coheed and Cambria, a rock band from Nyack, New York, formed in 1995
 Chocolate and Cheese, album by Ween
 Codes and ciphers, see Cryptography
 Command and control, the exercise of authority by a commanding officer over military forces in the accomplishment of a mission
 Command and control (management), an approach to decision making in organizations
 Command and control (malware), a control mechanism for botnets
 Command & Conquer, a real-time strategy video game series
 Contraction and Convergence, an approach to limiting carbon dioxide emissions globally